Węgorzyno  (formerly ) is a town in Łobez County, West Pomeranian Voivodeship, Poland, located on Lake Węgorzyno. It is the seat of Gmina Węgorzyno. As of 2009 it had a population of 3021 people. It is a retail and leisure resort.

Notable residents
 Werner Dallmann (1924 – 1945) Waffen SS officer
 Joachim Christian Timm (1734 - 1805), German apothecary and botanist

References

External links
Official site

Cities and towns in West Pomeranian Voivodeship
Łobez County